The Republic of Liège was a short-lived state centred on the town of Liège in modern-day Belgium. The republic was created in August 1789 after the Liège Revolution led to the destruction of the earlier ecclesiastical state which controlled the territory, the Prince-Bishopric of Liège. It coexisted with the even more short-lived revolutionary state, the United States of Belgium, created by the Brabant Revolution of 1789, to the north. By 1791, the forces of the republic had been defeated by Prussian and Austrian forces and the Prince-Bishopric was restored.

Revolution

On 18 August 1789, Jean-Nicolas Bassenge and other democrats arrived at the Hôtel de Ville of Liège. They demanded the dismissal of current magistrates in favour of two popular burgomasters: Jacques-Joseph Fabry and Jean-Remy de Chestret. The citadel of Saint Walburge fell into the hands of the rebels. The Prince-Bishop, César-Constantin-François de Hoensbroeck, was brought back from his Summer Palace in Seraing to ratify the nomination of the new officials and to abolish the unpopular Règlement de 1684. Several days later, de Hoensbroeck fled to the city of Trier in modern Germany. The Holy Roman Empire condemned the Liège revolution and demanded the restoration of the ancien régime in the prince-bishopric.

The radical mood in Liège led to the proclamation of a republic, two years before France proclaimed itself a republic.

Law
One of the first acts of the republic was the introduction of the "Declaration of the Rights of Man and Citizen of Franchimont" on 16 September 1789. The document was heavily influenced by the French Declaration of the Rights of Man and of the Citizen introduced in August 1789 but contained several important differences:

Article 3: Sovereignty resides in the people [and not the nation]
Article 10: Every citizen has freedom of thought and opinion [without restriction]
Article 17 of the French declaration concerning property is absent because civil and legal rights in Liège relative to property had been in force since 1196.

Further reading

External links
Declaration of the Rights of Man and Citizen of Franchimont

Former republics
Former unrecognized countries
Republic of Liège
1789 establishments in Europe
1791 disestablishments in Europe
States and territories established in 1789
States and territories disestablished in 1791